Clarence Henry "Grinny" Simpson (January 3, 1906 – April 21, 1959) was an American baseball outfielder in the Negro leagues. He played with the Cleveland Giants and the Akron Black Tyrites in 1933.

References

External links
 and Seamheads

Akron Black Tyrites players
Cleveland Giants players
1906 births
1959 deaths
Baseball players from Pennsylvania
Baseball outfielders
20th-century African-American sportspeople